IAFL may refer to:
 The Irish American Football League
 The International Association of Forensic Linguists